Cartagogena ferruminata is a species of moth of the family Tortricidae. It is found in Costa Rica.

The wingspan is 23–25 mm. The ground colour of the forewings is pale brownish cream, suffused and strigulated (finely streaked) with dark rust-brown. The hindwings are pale brownish cream suffused with brown on the periphery.

References

Moths described in 1992
Cochylini